"Temptation" is the fourth and final single from Wet Wet Wet's debut album, Popped In Souled Out. It was released on 7 March 1988, and reached number 12 on the UK Singles Chart.

Three versions of the song have been released. The original album version contains a longer middle eight than the single version, which also contains the expletive "don't waste my fucking spirit".  The single version has this edited to "don't waste my angry spirit", and was also the version played on radio. The radio edit version is also used in End of Part One: Their Greatest Hits .

Marti Pellow recorded his own version of the song for inclusion on his 2002 album Marti Pellow Sings the Hits of Wet Wet Wet & Smile, but once again contains the expletive line within the middle eight from the original Wet Wet Wet version.

Track listings
CD:
"Temptation" (extended version)
"Bottled Emotions"
"I Remember" (extended version)
"Heaven Help Us All"

7":
"Temptation"
"Bottled Emotions"

12":
"Temptation"
"Bottled Emotions"
"I Remember" (extended version)

References

Wet Wet Wet songs
1988 singles
1987 songs
PolyGram singles
Songs written by Marti Pellow
Songs written by Tommy Cunningham
Songs written by Graeme Clark (musician)
Songs written by Neil Mitchell (musician)